Šaranović is a family name most spread in Bosnia, Montenegro and Serbia. It is derived from ancient Slavic word Šar which was also basis for some other family names like Šarančić, Šaranac, Šaran, Šare....

Notable people with Šaranović surname include:
 Edin Šaranović
 Anja Šaranović
 Slobodan Šaranović
 Nikola Šaranović (sport shooter)
 Nikola Šaranović (basketball)

References

Serbian surnames